Seba Beach is a summer village located  west of Edmonton in Alberta, Canada. The main employer to those within the village and surrounding area is the Sundance Generating Plant, a coal-fired power plant located on the south side of the lake, owned and operated by TransAlta Utilities.

A large cabin-going community exists during the summer, although the village is populated year round.  Local sites include The Seba Heritage Museum and Memory Wall,  Wabamun Lake, the village marina and pier, a public library, and several businesses including a restaurant, a general store, a miniature golf course, a golf resort, and a recreational vehicle park.

Seba Beach is one of the few summer villages in Alberta that employs community peace officers.  The duties of its two peace officers include traffic and liquor enforcement as well as emergency response.

August long weekend is the annual Regatta at Seba Beach, which features a parade, dance, foot races, fireworks, beach volleyball tournament, and cribbage tournament, among other events. During the summer and fall, there is a weekly farmers market on Saturdays.

Fish within the lake include northern pike, whitefish, walleye, and yellow perch.

Demographics 

Edmonton Yacht Club 

The Edmonton Yacht Club, founded in 1923, is the main sailing club of Seba Beach, located at 1 Avenue and 2 Street West. In 1989, Margaret Lemieux compiled 'Wind in the sails : the Edmonton Yacht Club, 1923-1981', which documented the history of the Edmonton Yacht Club and sailing in Alberta during this time period, published through the Seba Beach Heritage Society from records of the Edmonton Yacht Club from Cooking Lake and Seba Beach.

See also 
List of communities in Alberta
List of summer villages in Alberta
List of resort villages in Saskatchewan

References

External links 

1920 establishments in Alberta
Edmonton Metropolitan Region
Summer villages in Alberta